The Pannonian mixed forests is a temperate broadleaf and mixed forests ecoregion in Europe. It covers an area of 307,720 km2 in Austria, Bosnia and Herzegovina, Czech Republic, Hungary, Romania, Serbia, Slovakia, Slovenia, Ukraine, and Croatia.

Flora 
The plant communities include mixed oak-hornbeam forests, mixed  pedunculate  and  sessile oak forests, and other mixed forests as well as sub-Mediterranean thermophilous bitter oak forests, azonal floodplain vegetation, and lowland to montane herb-grass steppes.

Fauna

Mammals

Reptiles and amphibians

Birds

References

External links 

 

Ecoregions of Austria
Ecoregions of Bosnia and Herzegovina
Ecoregions of Croatia
Ecoregions of the Czech Republic
Ecoregions of Romania
Ecoregions of Serbia
Ecoregions of Slovakia
Ecoregions of Slovenia
Ecoregions of Ukraine
Palearctic ecoregions
Temperate broadleaf and mixed forests